Edgar Mason may refer to:

 Edgar Mason (1934–2011), an American golfer
 Edgar Mason (1953–1996), a Mexican columnist